The Ireland cricket team are scheduled to tour England in June 2023 to play one four-day Test match and again in September 2023 for three One Day International (ODI) matches.
As a warm-up to the Test match, Ireland will play a three day game against Essex.

Tour match

Three-day match: Essex vs Ireland

Only Test

ODI Series

1st ODI

2nd ODI

3rd ODI

References

External links
 Series home at ESPN Cricinfo

International cricket competitions in 2023
2023 in English cricket
2023 in Irish cricket
Irish cricket tours of England